Jarayotar is a Village Development Committee in Bhojpur District in the Kosi Zone of eastern Nepal. At the time of the 2011 Nepal census it had a population of 4031 persons residing in 721 individual households. According to ancestors, this place had a large forest with many animals among which antelope (Jarayo in Nepali) were abundant and the land was dug by them to form a plain land. So, the name of the village was kept Jarayotar.

References

External links
UN map of the municipalities of Bhojpur District

Populated places in Bhojpur District, Nepal